Polk State College, formerly Polk Community College, is a public college in Winter Haven, Florida. It is part of the Florida College System.

The college changed its name from Polk Community College in 2009 to reflect its first Bachelor's degree program. Originally named Polk Junior College, it began classes in 1964. The main campus is located in Winter Haven, a second campus is located in nearby Lakeland. Smaller centers exist in Bartow, Florida, Lake Wales, Florida, Winter Haven, Florida, and two in Lakeland, Fl,

History
In 1982 Maryly Van Leer Peck became the first woman community college president in Florida.

Academics 
Total enrollment is about 10,000 credit students and 8,700 non-credit students, served by a staff of about 1200 faculty members. Of the total credit students over 5,400 attend classes in Lakeland, 4,000 attend in Winter Haven, and over 500 attend in Lake Wales. In 2004, the Collegiate High School was opened on the Lakeland campus, and a second CHS, Chain of Lakes Collegiate High School, opened in Winter Haven in Fall 2006. The Board of Trustees approved a name change at the March 23, 2009 meeting and the college became Polk State College on July 1, 2009. The Polk State College Libraries serve students of Collegiate High School, Chain of Lakes Collegiate High School, Florida community college and university students with a growing collection of traditional and virtual resources including art prints, sculpture, and audio/video formats.

Athletics 

Polk State competes in the Suncoast Conference of division I of the NJCAA Region 8 within the Florida State College Activities Association (FSCAA) and offers athletic programs in men's basketball and baseball, and women's cheerleading, soccer, softball and volleyball
As of 2013, men's basketball has won 12 Suncoast Conference championships, three NJCAA region 8 championships.

PSC Collegiate High School 
Polk State College's Lakeland and Winter Haven campuses host the 'PSC Collegiate High School Program' where students can earn their Associates of Arts (AA) degree while completing their normal high school requirements. Student can also enroll in programs such as Information technology (IT) or take the route of finishing general education prerequisites for their field of choice. Juniors and seniors in high school who meet a certain GPA requirement are currently the only ones eligible for the program. Taking the standardized PERT test is also an entry requirement; passing scores include: Reading 104-150, English 99-150, Math 113-150.

Notable people
 Mark Brisker, American-Israeli professional basketball player
 Robert Gilchrist, professional basketball player
 Denise Grimsley, member of the Florida House of Representatives
 Maryly Van Leer Peck Academic
Dean Pelman (born 1995), Israeli-American baseball pitcher for the Israel National Baseball Team
 Lawrence Scarpa, architect
 Lorenzo Williams, former NBA basketball player

References

External links 
 

Educational institutions established in 1964
Florida College System
Two-year colleges in the United States
Universities and colleges in Lakeland, Florida
Universities and colleges in Polk County, Florida
Universities and colleges accredited by the Southern Association of Colleges and Schools
Buildings and structures in Winter Haven, Florida
1964 establishments in Florida
NJCAA athletics